The Network of Bay Area Worker Cooperatives (NoBAWC - pronounced "No Boss") is a network of worker cooperatives dedicated to building workplace democracy in the San Francisco Bay Area.

NoBAWC was founded in September 1994 when workers representing nine worker cooperatives met to address their isolation and to build a worker cooperative movement in the region. Twelve years later, NoBAWC comprises over 30 dues-paying workplaces with a paid staff. NoBAWC is a member of the United States Federation of Worker Cooperatives.

Members
AK Press
Arizmendi Bakery
Arizmendi Association of Cooperatives
Berkeley Free Clinic
BioFuel Oasis
Bound Together Bookstore
Box Dog Bikes
Cheese Board 
City Art Gallery
Cricket Courier Cooperative
Cupid Courier Collective
Design Action Collective
Electric Embers
Heartwood Cooperative Woodshop
Inkworks Press
Juice Bar Collective
Liberation Ink
Lusty Lady
Mandela Foods Cooperative
Market Street Cooperative
Missing Link Bicycle Cooperative
Modern Times Bookstore
Nabolom Bakery
924 Gilman Street Project
Other Avenues Food Store
Pedal Express
Points of Distribution
Rainbow Grocery Cooperative
Red Vic Movie House
Rock Paper Scissors Collective
San Francisco Community Colocation Project
Suigetsukan Martial Arts School
TechCollective

External links
 NOBAWC
 Be Your Own Boss, Join a Collective, Berkeley Daily Planet (7/29/2005)
 A World Without Bosses?, AlterNet (7/2/2005)

See also
Berkeley Student Cooperative
Berkeley Student Food Collective

References

Organizations based in Alameda County, California
Cooperative federations
Cooperatives in the San Francisco Bay Area
Worker cooperatives of the United States